Bus Riley's Back in Town is a 1965 American drama film written by William Inge, directed by Harvey Hart, and starring Ann-Margret and Michael Parks.

Inge was very unhappy with changes made to his script and had his name removed from the credits, replacing it with the name "Walter Gage". It turned out to be the last of Inge's works brought to the screen during his lifetime. Although Ann-Margret was the film's best-known cast member, trailers for Bus Riley heavily promoted Parks as Hollywood's next big star.

Plot
After three years in the Navy, Bus Riley (Michael Parks) returns to his hometown, moves back in with his mother and sisters, and begins trying to make a life for himself. He suffers a series of personal and career disappointments. Riley is a highly skilled mechanic, but resists suggestions that he work for the local garage and attend college at night, as he aspires to a career he considers more respectable and prestigious.

Riley discovers that an older male friend who has promised him a mortician's job wants a live-in sexual relationship as part of the bargain; disillusioned, Riley rejects the offer. He takes a job as a door-to-door vacuum cleaner salesman, but ends up fending off advances from lonely housewives. To compound his unhappiness, Riley learns that his beautiful but shallow girlfriend Laurel (Ann-Margret) has married a wealthy older man in his absence. Bored with her society life, Laurel dives fully clothed into the swimming pool at her home one night and by showing how her wet clothing has molded itself to her breasts, lures Riley into having an affair with her against his better judgment.

Judy (Janet Margolin), a family friend, loses her mother and her home in a fire, leading to a romance with Riley that gives him hope for the future. He takes the garage job. After his sisters and mother learn of his affair with Laurel and confront him, Riley realizes he does not love the selfish and manipulative Laurel and breaks up with her for good, regaining the self-confidence to be proud of his work at the garage.

Cast

Production
The production started as a one-act play by Inge. It was produced at Pennsylvania State University in 1958, and he then set about expanding it. In 1962, he said, "Right now it's in a formless stage, half movie, half play. I intend to make it into a play. It's about a success symbol of today - a young movie actor returning to his home town. It deals with some of the forces in his life that compelled his drive for success and that made success a necessity for his survival. It is not based on any particular person. It's more of a composite portrait."

It was originally known as All Kinds of People. Parks was cast off the back of his work in Wild Seed.

In a bar scene with Bus and Howie discussing employment opportunities, a groovy version of the popular song "Downtown" minus lyrics is played in background from beginning to end for the duration of the scene.

Reception
Filmink argued "Parts of Bus Reilly are actually effective, but this was made at Universal who, as in Kitten with a Whip, did it on the cheap. Films like this need to be done with more care and money – or a better director than Harvey Hart, who was fine, but no Elia Kazan. Inge took his name off the movie after additional footage was shot involving Ann-Margret. Looking at the film today, there was nothing wrong with giving her character more screen time, it’s just that it was done badly."

References

External links
 

1965 films
Universal Pictures films
American LGBT-related films
1965 drama films
1965 LGBT-related films
Films directed by Harvey Hart
Films scored by Richard Markowitz
LGBT-related drama films
Films produced by Elliott Kastner
1960s English-language films
1960s American films